Globe Cinema was a single screen cinema hall and heritage building located in Lindsay Street (opposite New Market entrance), Kolkata, West Bengal, India. The theatre was previously known as Old Opera House. The wooden opera house was established in 1827 and sold to E M Cohen in 1906. Cohen converted it into a movie theatre and named it Globe Cinema. The theatre was owned by Sidhwa family and Jal Tata. Dhansri Abasan Pvt Ltd partnered with Goldstar Enclave Pvt Ltd and acquired the Globe Theatre Pvt Ltd from them.

The gigantic single-screen theatre has made way for a mini-mall with a twin-theatre multiplex, over 100 retail stores and a food court.

History 
The original wooden opera house was established in 1827. In 1906, the house, then known as Bijou Grand Opera House, was sold by E. H. Ducasse to E.M. Cohen. Cohen renamed it Grand Opera House. Later it was converted into a theatre hall and named Globe Cinema. This was one of the first few theatres in Calcutta which regularly screened English movies.

During World War II, the hall provided entertainment for Allied troops stationed in Calcutta.

In 2000, Arijit Dutta, film distributor of Priya Entertainment, leased the hall. Priya Entertainment returned it to the owners in April 2006.

In July, 2011 the cinema hall was acquired by Nitin Kumar Jain, Sri. Megh Raj Daga and Devinder Singh Shant. By 2014, under the stewardship of this team led by Jain and his company, Konsortia Construction Company Pvt. Ltd., the cinema hall was converted into a boutique shopping mall with about 100 shops and a two-screen multiplex, along with food courts.

References

External links 
 Bijou Grand Opera House
 Case history
 Official webpage of the Globe Mall

Cinemas in Kolkata
Former cinemas